Sun Jie (Chinese: 孙捷; Pinyin: Sūn Jié, born 9 February 1991 in Dalian) is a Chinese professional footballer who currently plays for and captains Chinese Super League club Changchun Yatai.

Club career
Sun started his professional football career in 2009 when he was promoted to Chinese Super League side Changchun Yatai's first team. He did not appear for Changchun in the 2009 league season. Sun began to play for the first team in the summer of 2010 as team manager Shen Xiangfu decided to give chances to young players. On 18 August, he made his senior debut in a 2–1 home victory against Shenzhen Ruby. Sun played 7 matches including starting 6 times in the 2010 league season. However, his playing time reduced in 2011 when he mainly spent his time in the reserve team league. He played 4 league matches in the 2012 season, all coming off the bench in the stoppage time. On 18 May 2013, he scored his first Super League goal against Dalian Aerbin in the 68th minute, which ensured Changchun's 2–2 draw.

On 29 March 2019, Sun was loaned to Eliteserien side Stabæk for the 2019 season.  After making just three cup appearances for the Norwegian club, Sun returned to Changchun during the summer transfer window.

Career statistics
Statistics accurate as of match played 29 June 2022.

Honours

Club
Changchun Yatai
 China League One: 2020

References

External links
 

Living people
1991 births
Chinese footballers
Footballers from Dalian
Changchun Yatai F.C. players
Stabæk Fotball players
Eliteserien players
Chinese Super League players
China League One players
Expatriate footballers in Norway
Association football defenders